The 2022 European Badminton Championships was the 29th tournament of the European Badminton Championships. It was held in Madrid, Spain, from 25 to 30 April 2022.

Tournament 
The 2022 European Badminton Championships was the 29th edition of the championships. The tournament was organized by the Badminton Europe with the local organizer Spanish Badminton Federation and sanctioned by the BWF.

The tournament consisted of men's (singles and doubles), women's (singles and doubles), and mixed doubles.

Finland was originally announced as the host for this championships during the 2021 European Mixed Team Badminton Championships, but withdrew due to COVID-19-related concerns.

Venue 
The tournament was held at the Polideportivo Municipal Gallur in Madrid, Spain.

Point distribution 
Below are the tables with the point distribution for each phase of the tournament based on the BWF points system for the European Badminton Championships, which is equivalent to a Super 500 event.

Medal summary

Medalists

Medal table

Participants 
216 players from 35 nations will participate this championship.

Men's singles

Seeds 

 Viktor Axelsen (champion)
 Anders Antonsen (final)
 Hans-Kristian Vittinghus (quarter-finals)
 Mark Caljouw (third round)
 Toma Junior Popov (semi-finals)
 Brice Leverdez (quarter-finals)
 Thomas Rouxel (quarter-finals)
 Nhat Nguyen (quarter-finals)

Wild card 
Badminton Europe (BEC) awarded a wild card entry to Alex Lanier of France.

Finals

Top half

Section 1

Section 2

Bottom half

Section 3

Section 4

Women's singles

Seeds 

 Carolina Marín (champion)
 Mia Blichfeldt (semi-finals)
 Kirsty Gilmour (final)
 Line Christophersen (quarter-finals)
 Yvonne Li (third round) Neslihan Yiğit (semi-finals)
 Line Kjærsfeldt (quarter-finals)
 Lianne Tan (quarter-finals)

Finals

Top half

Section 1

Section 2

Bottom half

Section 3

Section 4

Men's doubles

Seeds 

 Kim Astrup / Anders Skaarup Rasmussen (withdrew)
 Mark Lamsfuß / Marvin Seidel (champions)
 Ben Lane / Sean Vendy (semi-finals)
 Christo Popov / Toma Junior Popov (quarter-finals)
 Jeppe Bay / Lasse Mølhede (quarter-finals)
 Alexander Dunn / Adam Hall (final)
 Fabien Delrue / William Villeger (quarter-finals)
 Ruben Jille / Ties van der Lecq (semi-finals)

Wild card 
Badminton Europe (BEC) awarded a wild card entry to José Molares and Jaume Pérez of Spain.

Finals

Top half

Section 1

Section 2

Bottom half

Section 3

Section 4

Women's doubles

Seeds 

 Gabriela Stoeva / Stefani Stoeva (champions)
 Maiken Fruergaard / Sara Thygesen (semi-finals)
 Amalie Magelund / Freja Ravn (semi-finals)
 Linda Efler / Isabel Lohau (final)
 Julie MacPherson / Ciara Torrance (first round)
 Debora Jille / Cheryl Seinen (quarter-finals)
 Johanna Magnusson / Clara Nistad (quarter-finals)
 Christine Busch / Amalie Schulz (quarter-finals)

Wild card 
Badminton Europe (BEC) awarded a wild card entry to Chloe Birch and Jessica Pugh of England.

Finals

Top half

Section 1

Section 2

Bottom half

Section 3

Section 4

Mixed doubles

Seeds 

 Marcus Ellis / Lauren Smith (quarter-finals)
 Thom Gicquel / Delphine Delrue (final)
 Mathias Christiansen / Alexandra Bøje(quarter-finals)
 Mark Lamsfuß / Isabel Lohau (champions)
 Robin Tabeling / Selena Piek (semi-finals)
 Mikkel Mikkelsen / Rikke Søby Hansen (semi-finals)
 Adam Hall / Julie MacPherson (quarter-finals)
 Callum Hemming / Jessica Pugh (quarter-finals)

Wild card 
Badminton Europe (BEC) awarded a wild card entry to Alberto Zapico and Lorena Uslé of Spain.

Finals

Top half

Section 1

Section 2

Bottom half

Section 3

Section 4

References

External links 
Tournament link

European Badminton Championships
European Badminton Championships
International sports competitions hosted by Spain
2022 in Spanish sport
Badminton tournaments in Spain
Sports competitions in Madrid
2022 in Madrid
European Badminton Championships
Badminton